David William Heath (born February 16, 1969) is an American semi-retired  professional wrestler. He is best known for his appearances in the World Wrestling Federation (WWF) from 1998 to 2001 and intermittently throughout the mid-2000s under the ring name Gangrel. In recent time, he has worked in All Elite Wrestling.

Professional wrestling career

Early career (1987–1994)
Heath was trained by Boris Malenko in Florida. When his training was complete, he began performing in various independent promotions in the Florida area. In the Independent Professional Wrestling (IPW) promotion he won the IPW Tag Team Championship, before moving to Stampede Wrestling, where he formed a tag team with Tom Nash known as "The Blackhearts". Heath and Nash competed under masks as "Destruction" and "Apocalypse" respectively. They won the Stampede International Tag Team Championship as a team.

In the early nineties, the Blackhearts were paired with Nash's wife Luna, wrestling in Joel Goodhart's Tri-State Wrestling, in Herb Abrams' Universal Wrestling Federation, and finally Giant Baba's All-Japan, where the team split up. During that time, the marriage between Nash and Luna broke up, and Heath and Luna became romantically involved. They eventually married on Halloween 1994. The World Wrestling Federation (WWF), where Luna worked at the time, even broadcast a segment of Luna's "Wedding to a Vampire".

After the demise of the Blackhearts, Heath and Luna developed the Vampire Warrior gimmick, inspired by the movie The Lost Boys, under which, he wrestled in various promotions, including the Memphis-based United States Wrestling Association (USWA). Under this moniker, he won the USWA Southern Championship and the Pro Wrestling Illustrated Rookie of the Year award in 1993.

World Wrestling Federation (1993–1995)
In 1993, Heath received a tryout match with the World Wrestling Federation when he faced Kevin Kruger in an unaired match for Wrestling Challenge on June 14 in Columbus, Ohio. In late October 1993, the WWF began a Florida swing to their house show tour, and Heath made several appearances teaming with The Cuban Assassin and Little Louis in six-man matches against The Bushwhackers and Tiger Jackson.

On the March 28, 1994 episode of RAW, Heath made his televised debut for the WWF and lost to The 1-2-3 Kid. He was portrayed as a masked heel and dubbed "The Black Phantom", working as an enhancement talent against numerous stars, including Earthquake, Razor Ramon, The 1-2-3 Kid, Lex Luger, Bob Holly, Tatanka, Davey Boy Smith, Typhoon and others. His last match was on the July 9, 1995 edition of Wrestling Challenge, where he fell to the 1-2-3 Kid once more.

Extreme Championship Wrestling (1995)
In 1995, Heath appeared in Extreme Championship Wrestling (ECW) for a short period, feuding with Tommy Dreamer over Dreamer's affiliation with Heath's real-life wife Luna. He made his debut at Barbed Wire, Hoodies & Chokeslams in June 1995.

World Championship Wrestling (1997–1998)
Throughout 1997 and early 1998, Heath appeared as enhancement talent on WCW Pro and WCW Worldwide, wrestling Chris Jericho, Rey Mysterio, Dean Malenko, and Scotty Riggs in singles matches, and in tag matches, teaming with Todd Griffith and Johnny Boone once each against Public Enemy, and with Michael Nova against The Faces of Fear.

Return to WWF

The Brood (1998–1999)

In 1998, Heath was hired by the World Wrestling Federation (WWF) due to the support of then writers Bruce Prichard and Vince Russo, who believed in the merit of a vampire gimmick. Heath was given the name Gangrel, which was derived from a vampire clan from the role-playing game Vampire: The Masquerade. The gimmick involved an entrance which saw him rising from a ring of fire on stage, followed by a slow walk to the ring set to a sinister instrumental music theme. He also carried a goblet of "blood" with him and, during his entrance, would stop on the ring steps, take a drink, and spit it into the air.

Gangrel made his TV debut on the August 16, 1998 episode of Sunday Night Heat, defeating Scott Taylor. He then formed a gothic faction, called The Brood, with Edge and Christian. The Brood became known for their "blood baths", which involved the lights going out for a moment, and when they came back on, the targeted wrestler being covered in blood. The three temporarily joined up with The Undertaker and his Ministry of Darkness faction.

Gangrel got one of his first title shots at the 1999 Royal Rumble. He challenged D-Generation X member X-Pac for his WWF European Championship in a losing effort. He competed in the Royal Rumble match later that night and again the following year.

After splitting from the Ministry, The Brood began a feud with the Hardy Boyz and their manager Michael Hayes. During the feud, Gangrel suddenly turned on Edge and Christian and aligned himself with Matt and Jeff Hardy. He called the group The New Brood. Terri Runnels also began to show interest in the Hardy Boyz, however, and they eventually would win Terri's services as a manager, thus dumping Gangrel.

Final years (1999–2001)
Gangrel became a singles wrestler following the breakup of The New Brood; he was mainly used as a mid carder. In late 1999, he brought in his real-life wife Luna Vachon as his manager until she was fired. Gangrel continued working for the WWF until he was released in 2001.

Independent circuit (2001–present)

Heath wrestled for an independent promotion based in Cleveland, Ohio, called New Era Pro Wrestling. He competed in a casket match against NEPW, defeating Gutter.

Heath (as Vampire Warrior) wrestled for North American Wrestling (NAW). As Vampire Warrior, he wrestled in the main event of the ICWA's Show Revolution 5, losing to Joe Legend in a casket match for the NWA: ICWA France Heavyweight Championship.

In 2009, he was involved with the Hulkamania Australian Tour event in Melbourne, Australia. Teaming up with Black Pearl, he lost to The Nasty Boys in an Australian Street Fight. He has also wrestled for Vendetta Pro Wrestling, All Star Wrestling, Territory League, and Busted Knuckle Pro Wrestling.

On January 23, 2010, Gangrel was inducted into the Legends Pro Wrestling "Hall of Fame" by Jack Blaze in Wheeling, West Virginia, at their annual "LPW Over The Edge" event. On May 11 and 12, 2013, he participated in California-based Alpha Omega Wrestling's two-day "Pride of the Ring II" supercard in Indio, California. He was defeated in a four-man elimination match the first day and lost an AOW Heavyweight Championship match to Eric Watts on the second.

On May 18, 2013 Gangrel made his debut for Chikara, managing The Day Walkers (Alexandre Barnabus Castle and Mathias Cage) to the second round of the 2013 Tag World Grand Prix.

In August 2013, Gangrel toured Saskatchewan, Canada, with High Impact Wrestling Canada as part of the "Blood Wars" Tour.

On June 6, 2014, at House of Hardcore 4 Gangrel teamed with Joe Caldo and Hurricane Helms to defeat Vik Dalishus, Bill Carr, and Cerebus in a six-man tag team match. On June 7, at House of Hardcore 5 Gangrel teamed with Cerebus and Fungus to defeat Vik Dalishus, Dan Barry and Bill Carr in a six-man tag team match. On June 14, at House of Hardcore 6 Gangrel teamed with Matt Striker to face Rikishi & X-Pac in a losing effort.

In 2013 and 2014 Gangrel appeared with the West Coast Wrestling Connection based in Portland and Salem, Oregon. In 2015, Gangrel appeared for Big Time Wrestling events in Vermont, Maine, and Virginia. He also was a featured competitor for the Las Vegas-based Paragon Pro Wrestling.

On July 18, 2015, in Kitchener, Ontario, Gangrel won the Pure Wrestling Association Ontario championship, defeating EZE Eric Cairnie.  He lost the championship the next day to "Reckless" Ryan Swift.

On February 14, 2016, Gangrel appeared for Professional Wrestling Live in Solihull, West Midlands, UK at Kingshurst Labour Club and became the PWL Heavyweight Champion. Gangrel successfully defended this title on two occasions, but was defeated by local wrestler Jamie Firkin a.k.a. 'Johnny Thunder' on February 25, 2016. After initially defeating Thunder, a sneak attack enabled Thunder to cash in a guaranteed title match contract he held from a previous Money in the Bank match win.

Gangrel appeared at Over the Top Wrestling's Eighth Year Anniversary show at The Hangar in Wolverhampton, England on October 28, 2022, where he defeated Mad Kurt.

Second return to WWE (2004–2007)
Heath reunited with former Ministry of Darkness member Viscera in 2004, returning as a hired goon of John "Bradshaw" Layfield during a feud with The Undertaker. They were defeated by The Undertaker on the September 23 episode of SmackDown. In 2005, Heath was given another WWE contract and appeared in Ohio Valley Wrestling, the primary developmental territory of WWE. He was again released, however, before anything came of it.

In 2006, Heath was re-signed as a potential for WWE's newest brand, ECW, to appear in a vampire stable with Kevin Thorn and Ariel, but he never appeared. At the September 21 Deep South Wrestling (DSW) event, he wrestled Tommy Suede. He continued to wrestle in DSW while he waited to be called up to one of the main rosters. On January 18, 2007, Gangrel was released from WWE. On the 15th Anniversary WWE Raw special on December 10, 2007, Gangrel participated in a 15-man battle royal, but was eliminated by Al Snow.

All Elite Wrestling (2020, 2022) 
On November 7, 2020, Gangrel made his debut for All Elite Wrestling at Full Gear during the Elite Deletion match between Matt Hardy and Sammy Guevara, chastising Hardy for his disloyalty when Gangrel mentored him (referring to his time in the New Brood) before making an unsuccessful attempt to aid Guevara. 18 months later, on the May 27, 2022 episode of AEW Rampage of May 27, 2022, Gangrel would return to AEW to accompany The Young Bucks to ring during a tag team match they had with Jon Cruz and Taylor Rust. Following the match, which saw the Young Bucks victorious, Gangrel was betrayed by The Young Bucks, who attacked him. He would then be rescued by The Hardy Boyz, who he then reunited with him and assisted him in attacking Brandon Cutler.

Other media 
In May 2015, Heath appeared uncredited as a prisoner with Crohn's disease in The Human Centipede 3 (Final Sequence), starring Dieter Laser and Laurence R. Harvey. He appeared on the 10th episode of the WWE Network series, The Edge & Christian Show, released on May 2, 2016. Also in 2015, he was in a music video for rapper SonReal, on the song "For the Town".

Personal life
Heath has two children, David Jr. and Donovan, and has been married four times; first to Cheryl Richards from 1988 to 1991, then to fellow wrestler Luna Vachon from 1994 to 2006 (during which he was stepfather to Luna's sons Joshua and Van from her previous marriage to Dan Hurd), to Kiara Dillon from 2008 to 2013, and lastly, he married Susan Nelson in February 2022.

His signature fangs are the result of dental implants he received early on in his career with the WWF. It was reported it cost more than $10,000 for each one.

Heath briefly directed pornography, but gave it up because of his concerns that it was going to affect his wrestling career.

Championships and accomplishments
 All Pro Wrestling
APW Tag Team Championship (1 time) – with Billy Blade
 Americas Wrestling Federation (Puerto Rico)
AWF International Junior Heavyweight Championship (1 time)
 All-Star Wrestling (British Columbia)
ASW Trans-Canada Heavyweight Championship (3 times)
 Atlantic Wrestling Council
AWC Heavyweight Championship (1 time)
 European Wrestling Promotion
EWP World Heavyweight Championship (1 time)
EWP Ironman Title Hardcore Knockout Tournament (2003)
 Hoodslam
Hoodslam Golden Gig Championship (1 time)
 International Pro Wrestling Association
IPWA Tag Team Championship (2 times) – with Rusty Brooks
 Legends Pro Wrestling
LPW Hall of Fame (Class of 2010)
 Maximum Pro Wrestling
MXPW Heavyweight Championship (1 time)
 NWA Florida
NWA Florida Tag Team Championship (1 time) – with Tom Nash
 National Wrestling League
NWL Heavyweight Championship (1 time)
 Paragon Pro Wrestling
 PPW American Championship (1 time)
 Pro Wrestling Illustrated
Rookie of the Year (1993)
Ranked No. 102 of the top 500 wrestlers in the PWI 500 in 1999
 Pro Wrestling live
 PWL Heavyweight Championship (1 time)
 Pro Wrestling Revolution
PWR Heavyweight Championship (1 time)
 Pure Wrestling Association
 PWA Ontario Championship (1 time)
 Stampede Wrestling
Stampede International Tag Team Championship (1 time) – with Tom Nash
 Tri-State Wrestling Alliance
TWA Tag Team Championship (1 time) – with Blackheart Destruction
 United States Wrestling Association
 USWA Southern Heavyweight Championship (1 time)
Vanguard Championship Wrestling
VCW Heavyweight Championship (1 time) 
VCW Tag Team Championship (1 time) - with Kevin Thorn
 West Coast Wrestling Connection
 WCWC Pacific Northwest Championship (3 times)
WCWC Legacy Championship (3 times)
 WCWC Tag Team Championship (3 times) – with Mikey O'Shea (1) and Sinn Bodhi (2)

References

External links

 

1969 births
American male professional wrestlers
Living people
Masked wrestlers
American pornographic film directors
Professional wrestlers from Florida
Sportspeople from Tampa, Florida
Stampede Wrestling alumni
20th-century professional wrestlers
21st-century professional wrestlers
NWA Florida Tag Team Champions
Stampede Wrestling International Tag Team Champions